George R. Daisy (March 9, 1857 – April 17, 1931) was a 19th-century professional baseball player.

Sources

1857 births
1931 deaths
Baseball players from New Jersey
19th-century baseball players
Altoona Mountain Citys players
Altoona (minor league baseball) players
Danville (minor league baseball) players
Scranton Miners players
People from Gloucester City, New Jersey